Flight 30 may refer to:

World Airways Flight 30, crashed on 23 January 1982
Qantas Flight 30, suffered damage on 25 July 2008
Delta Air Lines Flight 30, suffered damage on 18 April 2018

0030